Adventist Health Feather River, also known as Feather River Hospital, is a 101-bed acute care hospital located in the town of Paradise, in Butte County, California, with a wide array of outpatient departments and services designed to meet the health care needs of Paradise, Magalia, and neighboring communities. It was severely damaged in the November 2018 Camp Fire and is currently closed.

History

In 1946, Dr. Merritt C. Horning envisioned building a “total health center” in Paradise, California. Dr. Horning shared this vision with three of his colleagues: Dr. Dean Hoiland, Dr. C.C. Landis and Dr. Glenn Blackwelder. These men, along with other community leaders, purchased  from Paradise Irrigation District for the price of back taxes – $3,500. Within the next few years, additional acreage was acquired throughout several purchases, eventually totaling . Labor and building materials were largely acquired through donations and volunteers.

Construction was scheduled to begin in April 1948, however, at the time funding was not available to build surgical and obstetrical units. When applying to the State of California for an operating license, the hospital board learned that the hospital did not qualify for a license unless it had a surgical unit. Dr. Horning contacted a friend, the state director of public health, and soon a new hospital classification was created to accommodate the project. Within days, Feather River received a license to operate as an acute medical facility containing 18 beds and officially opened in 1950.

Feather River has experienced three “firsts” in their geographical region. It was the only hospital in the area to train nurse assistants; they pioneered the teen volunteer program of candystripers and handystripers, and the facility was the first public building in Butte County to prohibit smoking.

In 1952, a surgery unit was added and by the end of the decade, a new wing also had been completed. More space was soon needed, so in 1964 a new food service department and a physician's office building was added. Four years later, in 1968, the construction of a new 150-bed hospital was completed. This facility is located uphill from the original building which now houses the hospital's Health Center.

The hospital founders and trustees desired to ensure the facility's long-term mission as an Adventist health care center and so in 1960 they entrusted the hospital to the Northern California Conference of Seventh-day Adventists. On January 8, 1973, Feather River joined Adventist Health and became Adventist Health/Feather River Hospital. Feather River Hospital first closed in 2008, because of the Humboldt Fire. In 2017, the name was changed to Adventist Health Feather River.

On November 8, 2018, Adventist Health Feather River was partially destroyed by the Camp Fire.  This fast moving wildfire propelled by high winds leveled a large portion of Paradise. This fire was the most destructive in California history.

2018 Camp Fire
Adventist Health Feather River was forced to evacuate after the fire jumped a road going to the hospital. Some people were trapped under Adventist Health Feather River in a tunnel until they could escape. Employees at Adventist Health Feather River evacuated 60 patients the morning of November 8, 2018. The patients were transported in ambulances, by helicopter and employee vehicles to Oroville Hospital,  Enloe Medical Center, in Chico and Orchard Hospital, in Gridley that very day.

2018 aftermath
Surrounding hospitals stepped up to take care of the patients that would normally be going to Adventist Health Feather River, the largest business in Paradise, which will not reopen until 2020, forcing 1,300 employees to be laid off or to relocate their employments at other hospitals and clinics in the area. Some employees have left the state to find work. The buildings that survived the fire include the hospital, the cancer center, the emergency department, the maternity ward, the outpatient surgery center and one clinic. The buildings that were destroyed include offices, clinics, cardiology building, radiology building and maintenance building.

Recovery
In October 2019, people gathered together at Adventist Health Feather River after Senate Bill 156 was approved by the California State Legislature. This allows the emergency room to operate without a hospital–the first in the history of the state of California.

Services
The services of Adventist Health Feather River were: Behavioral medicine, treatment of cancer, cardiology, critical care medicine, diagnostic laboratory, emergency department, GI laboratory, home health, hospice, outpatient medical offices, home oxygen, medical imaging, obstetrics, rural health center, sleep medicine, surgery, and women's health.

In 1999, Feather River became the first hospital in Northern California to house an Endoscopy Suite complete with voice activated, hands free surgical equipment. It was one of only four hospitals in the region with an anticoagulation clinic, and funded a wide range of preventive treatment programs.

Awards
In 2018 Adventist Health Feather River won the Women's Choice Award and has also won four awards from Healthgrades.

See also
Feather River

References

External links
 
Nurse Describes Harrowing Hospital Evacuation of Patients During California Fires: 'We Had to Go' People
Inside the Fiery Furnace: A Chaplain's Harrowing Story of Survival in Paradise Time
Camp Fire: Nurse who helped evacuate patients recounts harrowing escape from wildfire CBS THIS MORNING
Camp Fire superhero doctor rescues patient from burning ambulance: 'I think you just do it' YAHOO! LIFESTYLE
When 'hell moved in,' a California nurse drove through fire to save lives The Washington Post
'I thought I was gonna die right there': Nurse's harrowing escape from California wildfire Abc News
Nurses fleeing fast-moving Camp Fire scramble to save patients-and themselves NBC NEWS
The Latest: Fire Captain Says Wildfire Destroys Calif. Town U.S. News
California wildfires: The day Paradise burned down BBC News
California wildfires: Nurse drives through deadly Paradise blaze to evacuate patients INDEPENDENT

Hospital buildings completed in 1950
Hospitals in California
Adventist Health
Buildings and structures in Butte County, California